Clytra cingulata is a species of leaf beetle from the tribe Clytrini that can be found in Asia Minor and the Middle East.

References

Beetles described in 1898
Beetles of Asia
Clytrini
Taxa named by Julius Weise